Brontostoma is a neotropical genus of assassin bugs in the family Reduviidae. About 20 species have been described. These species are brightly colored with reds and oranges, and like all members of the Ectrichodiinae, specialize on millipede prey.

Partial list of species

Brontostoma bahiensis Gil-Santana 2004
Brontostoma deferreri
Brontostoma discus Burmeister, 1835
Brontostoma diringshofeni
Brontostoma notatum
Brontostoma rubrum
Brontostoma sanguinosum Stål, 1872
Brontostoma trux

References

Reduviidae